This is a list of films which have placed number one at the weekly box office in Japan during 2001. Amounts are in Yen and, for the first five weeks, are only grosses from the top nine key cities.

References

See also
 Lists of box office number-one films

2001
2001 in Japanese cinema
Japan